Skopin (Russian: Скопин) is a Russian masculine surname, its feminine counterpart is Skopina. It may refer to the following notable people:
Alexander Skopin (1927–2003), Russian mathematician 
Mikhail Skopin-Shuisky (1586–1610), Russian statesman and military figure
Timofey Skopin (born 1989), Russian speed skater

Russian-language surnames